Nigel Latta,  (born 1967) is a New Zealand psychologist and author. He is also the host of the television show Beyond The Darklands, The Politically Incorrect Guide to Teenagers and The Politically Incorrect Parenting Show. He revealed on The Hard Stuff with Nigel Latta that he had 3 stints at university from 1986 to 1995, two in Otago University in philosophy, zoology, and finished in Auckland University with BSc in psychology and postgraduate diploma.

Latta was appointed an Officer of the New Zealand Order of Merit in the 2012 Queen's Birthday and Diamond Jubilee Honours, for services as a psychologist.

Filmography

Publications
 (updated edition)

References

External links 
 
 
 

1967 births
Living people
New Zealand psychologists
New Zealand crime fiction writers
University of Otago alumni
Officers of the New Zealand Order of Merit
University of Auckland alumni